Kazan is a 1921 American silent Western film. Now lost, it was directed by Bertram Bracken and starring Jane Novak and Ben Deeley. It was produced by William N. Selig and distributed independently. The picture was based upon a novel by James Oliver Curwood. In 1949 it was remade as a sound film of the same title.

Cast
 Jane Novak as Joan Radison
 Ben Deeley as Jim Thorpe
 William Ryno as Pierre Radisson
 Ben Hagerty as Frank Radisson
 Edwin Wallock as Black McCready

References

External links

 
 

1921 films
1921 Western (genre) films
American black-and-white films
1920s English-language films
Films about dogs
Films based on American novels
Films based on novels by James Oliver Curwood
Films directed by Irving Cummings
Fox Film films
Lost American films
Lost Western (genre) films
Northern (genre) films
Royal Canadian Mounted Police in fiction
Silent American Western (genre) films
Lost drama films
1921 lost films
1920s American films